Lettuce infectious yellows virus (LIYV) is a plant pathogenic virus of the family Closteroviridae.

References

External links
 ICTVdB—The Universal Virus Database: Lettuce infectious yellows virus
 Family Groups—The Baltimore Method

Closteroviridae
Viral plant pathogens and diseases